The Puerto Rico Department of Housing is the department responsible for homeownership, affordable housing, and community assistance programs in Puerto Rico. It was created in 1972.

Programs 
The agency is tasked with managing HUD funds including for housing under Section 8 (housing). The agency also administers Community Development Block Grants (CDBG-DR) used for building housing for those affected by natural disasters.

Secretary

In 2021, governor Pedro Pierluisi designated William Rodríguez Rodríguez as the new secretary of the department.

See also 
Public housing in Puerto Rico

References

Executive departments of the government of Puerto Rico